is a Japanese singer and occasional actress. She married Seiji Kameda, a musician.

References

External links
  

1961 births
Living people
Anime musicians
Japanese actresses
Japanese women pop singers
People from Miyazaki Prefecture